Bidenisms are comments from U.S. President Joe Biden unique to his speaking style.

In 2014 Jonathan Topaz of Politico noted that Biden's "off-the-cuff style has made him perhaps the most eminently quotable person in Washington". In his piece Topaz listed 15 top Bidenisms from The New Yorker profile of Biden. Evan Osnos of The New Yorker commented that Biden disliked teleprompters, which resulted in gaffes called "Joe Bombs" by Barack Obama's team during their competitive campaign for presidency. An example: "Folks, I can tell you I've known eight Presidents, three of them intimately". In his childhood, Biden stuttered, and reading aloud was still more difficult for him compared to an improvised talk.
"It looks like we're alone, so why don't you call me Mr. President and I'll call you Mr. Prime Minister." - Biden joked while Vice President at the beginning of a meeting with a British minister.
"I can die a happy man not being a president" - when asked about joining the presidential race.

Matt Viser of The Washington Post notes that Biden frequently inserts quotes of his relatives, most often of his father, a car salesman. "My dad had an expression, 'Joey, don't compare me to the Almighty, compare me to the alternative.'" Viser said it is hard to say whether all these quotes do come from Biden's clan: "…his father seemed to have enough sayings to fit almost every circumstance — even geopolitical lessons".

See also
 Bushism

References

External links
"Joe Bidenisms: The Funniest and Best Joe Biden Gaffes", Ranker - this web page allows the reader to rank Bidenisms

2010s neologisms
American political neologisms
Political terminology of the United States
Word play
Terms for quotations of notable persons
Joe Biden